Not Modern is an EP by Babyland, released in 2008 by Mattress Recordings.

Track listing

Personnel
Adapted from the Not Modern liner notes.

Babyland
 Dan Gatto – lead vocals, programming, mixing
 Michael Smith – programming, mixing

Production and design
 Larry Goetz – engineering
 Giuliana Maresca – cover art, illustrations, photography

Release history

References

External links 
 Not Modern at Discogs (list of releases)

2008 EPs
Babyland albums